The 2019 European Combined Events Team Championships was the 34th edition of the biennial international team track and field competition for European combined track and field events specialists, with contests in men's decathlon and women's heptathlon. Held over 6–7 July, it consisted of three divisions: Super League, 1st League, and 2nd League. The Super League events were held at Avanhard Stadium in Lutsk, Ukraine, while the lower divisions were held at the Centro Desportivo da Madeira in Ribeira Brava, Portugal. National teams were ranked on the combined points totals of their best three athletes in both men's and women's competitions.

Estonia won the Super League competition, led by Maicel Uibo and Mari Klaup-McColl. The Czech Republic and Finland took first and second in the 1st League to gain promotion to the Super League. Belgium and Ireland were the top two nations in the 2nd League, earning promotion to the 1st League. The best individual performers across the championships were Belarusian Vital Zhuk in the decathlon, with 8237 points, and Ukraine's Daryna Sloboda, with a personal best of 6165 points in the heptathlon.

Divisions

Super League

Participation 
 
 
 
 
  (promoted from 1st League)
 
 
  (promoted from 1st League)

The Netherlands competed in the women's heptathlon only.

Decathlon

Heptathlon

Team 
Czech Republic and Netherlands were relegated to the 1st League

1st League

Decathlon

Heptathlon

Team 
Czech Republic and Finland were promoted to the Super League, while Sweden and Latvia were relegated to the 2nd League

2nd League 
Belgium and Ireland were promoted to the 1st League

Individual

Team

References

Results
 Super League results

European Combined Events Team Championships
European Cup Combined Events
European Cup Combined Events
European Cup Combined Events
International athletics competitions hosted by Portugal
European Cup Combined Events